Underwriting profit is a term used in the insurance industry.  It consists of the earned premium remaining after losses have been paid and administrative expenses have been deducted. It does not include any investment income earned on held premiums. Many companies will eschew underwriting profit in order to gain a greater market share.

Examples
For example, an auto insurer collects money every month from its customers in the form of a premium. Should a customer have a covered auto accident, the company pays out a claim. In the time between the receipt of each premium payment and the paying of the claim, the money received by the insurer can be invested. Returns from investments are the primary source of profits for an insurance company. If the amount of premiums taken in is greater than the claims paid out, even before taking into account investment returns, the excess additional profit is called "underwriting profit". Another prime example occurs when using Insured Profits.

See also
 Insurance
 Financial services (broader industry to which insurance belongs)
 Insurance law
 List of finance topics
 List of insurance topics
 List of United States insurance companies
 Social security
 Opportunity cost

Insurance
Underwriting